Finance Trust Bank (FTB), commonly called Finance Trust, is a commercial bank in Uganda. It is licensed by the Bank of Uganda, the central bank and national banking regulator.

Location
The headquarters of FTB are located on Plot 121 & 115, Block 6, Finance Trust Building, Katwe, in the Central Division of Kampala, Uganda's capital city. The coordinates of the institution's headquarters are 0°18'08.0"N, 32°34'35.0"E (Latitude:0.302223; Longitude:32.576403).

History
FTB was founded in 1984 as Uganda Women's Finance Trust Limited. The objective was to provide financial services to low income people in Uganda, especially women. Sixty percent of the bank's customers are women. Subsequently, the institution rebranded to Uganda Finance Trust Limited, a Tier III financial institution, recognized as a microfinance deposit-taking institution under the supervision of the Bank of Uganda. On 11 November 2013, the Bank of Uganda granted the bank a full commercial banking license. The institution then rebranded to its current name.

Overview
As of 31 December 2021, FTB serviced over 500,000 savers and over 29,000 borrowers through a network of 34 interconnected branches, located in all regions of the country. The bank's total customer deposits were UGX:183.4 billion (US$51.8 million). At that time, the bank's total assets were valued at UGX:393.9 billion (approx. US$111.3 million), with shareholders' equity of UGX:61.2 billion (approx. US$17.29 million).

Ownership
The stock ownership of the institution as of May 2018 is summarized in the table below.

Branch network
As of April 2022, FTB maintained a network of 34 interconnected branches at the following locations:

 Main Branch - Katwe Road, Katwe, Kampala
 Arua Branch - Arua
 Bombo Road Branch - Bombo Road, Kampala
 Busia Branch - Custom Road, Busia
 Entebbe Branch - Kampala Road, Entebbe
 Fort Portal Branch - Rukidi III Street, Fort Portal
 Gomba Branch - Kanoni, Gomba District
 Iganga Branch - Main Street, Iganga
 Ishaka Branch - Rukungiri Road, Ishaka
 Jinja Branch - Iganga Road, Jinja
 Kalangala Branch - Kalangala
 Kaleerwe Branch - Kaleerwe, Kampala
 Kampala Road Branch - Kampala Road, Kampala
 Kamuli Branch - Kitimbo Road, Kamuli
 Kamwenge Branch - Station Road, Kamwenge
 Kapchorwa Branch - 46 Kapchorwa Road, Kapchorwa
 Kayunga Branch - Main Street, Kayunga
 Kikuubo Branch - Nakivubo Road, Kampala
 Kitintale Branch - Kitintale - Kampala
 Kumi Branch - Ngora Road, Kumi
 Lugazi Branch - Kampala-Jinja Highway, Lugazi
 Lwengo Branch - Mbiriizi, Lwengo District
 Masaka Branch - Edward Avenue, Masaka
 Mbale Branch - Republic Street, Mbale
 Mbarara Branch - High Street, Mbarara
 Mukono Branch - Kampala–Jinja Highway, Mukono
 Nakivubo Branch - 30-32 Mackay Road, Freeman Foundation Building, Kampala
 Nansana Branch - Hoima Road, Nansana
 Nateete Branch - Masaka Road, Nateete
 Ntungamo Branch - Old Kabale Road, Ntungamo
 Owino Branch - Kafumbe Mukasa Road, Kampala
 Pallisa Branch - Kasodo Road, Pallisa
 Soroti Branch - Solot Avenue, Soroti
 Tororo Branch - Bazaar Street, Tororo

Governance
Evelyn Kigozi Kahiigi is the chairperson of the board of directors. She is one of the non-executive directors of the bank. There are ten other board members, including Annet Nakawunde Mulindwa, the managing director, and Annette Kiggundu is the only other executive director on the board.

See also
 List of banks in Africa
 List of banks in Uganda

References

External links
 Finance Trust Bank Homepage

Banks of Uganda
Banks established in 1984
1984 establishments in Uganda
Companies based in Kampala